This is a list of video games that use the technique of cel shading, organized alphabetically by name. See lists of video games for related lists.

References

 
Cel-shading